Bonavia or Bonavía is an Italian surname. Notable people with the surname include:

Carlo Bonavia (d. 1788), Italian painter
Emanuel Bonavia (1826-1908), physician and naturalist in British India
Ferruccio Bonavia (1877-1950), Italian-English writer on music and composer
Giuseppe Bonavia (1821–1885), Maltese draughtsman and architect
John Bonavia (b. 1989), American actor
Maria Luisa Carranque y Bonavía, Spanish noblewoman and painter
Santiago Bonavía (1700–1760), Italian architect and painter 
Victor Bonavia (1893–1948), Maltese cricketer, physician and British Army officer

Italian-language surnames